POPC is a phosphatidylcholine. It is a diacylglycerol and phospholipid. The full name is 1-palmitoyl-2-oleoyl-sn-glycero-3-phosphocholine. It is an important phospholipid for biophysical experiments and has been used to study various subjects such as lipid rafts. POPC is also used in systems mimicking the cell membrane such as Nanodiscs. It is available commercially synthetically and is naturally present in eukaryotic cell membranes.

References 

Phosphatidylcholines
Phospholipids